The Men's 10 metre air pistol event at the 2013 Southeast Asian Games took place on 11 December 2013 at the North Dagon Shooting Range in Yangon, Myanmar.

The event consisted of two rounds: a qualifier and a final. In the qualifier, each shooter fired 60 shots with a .22 Long Rifle at 50 metres distance from the prone position at 10 metres distance. Scores for each shot were in increments of 0.1, with a maximum score of 10.9.

The top 8 shooters in the qualifying round moved on to the final round. The final consisted of 2 strings of 3 shots, after which for every two additional shots, the lowest scoring finalist was dropped. This continued until only two finalists remained to make the final two shots for the gold. The Final two shooters would have totalled 20 shots. These shots scored in increments of 0.1, with a maximum score of 10.9.

Schedule
All times are Myanmar Standard Time (UTC+06:30)

Qualification round

Final

References

Shooting at the 2013 Southeast Asian Games